Tõreska is a village in Kuusalu Parish, Harju County in northeast Estonia.

References
 

Villages in Harju County